Dwight L. Smith (born August 13, 1978) is an American former college and professional football player who was a safety in the National Football League (NFL) for eight seasons.  He played college football for the University of Akron, and earned consensus All-American honors.  The Tampa Bay Buccaneers picked him in the third round of the 2001 NFL Draft, and he also played professionally for the New Orleans Saints, Minnesota Vikings and Detroit Lions of the NFL.  Smith earned a Super Bowl ring with the Buccaneers in Super Bowl XXXVII.

Early years
Smith was born in Detroit, Michigan.  He attended Central High School in Detroit, and played high school football for the Central Trailblazers.

College career
He attended the University of Akron, where he played for the Akron Zips football team from 1997 to 2000.  As a senior in 2000, he had 10 interceptions and was recognized as a consensus first-team All-American at defensive back along with being a finalist for the Thorpe Award.

Professional career

Tampa Bay Buccaneers
Smith began his career with the Tampa Bay Buccaneers from 2001 to 2004.  Smith's career highlight came in the Bucs' 48–21 victory over the Oakland Raiders in Super Bowl XXXVII, in which Smith intercepted two passes from quarterback Rich Gannon, returning both for touchdowns.  He was the first player ever to score 2 touchdowns on interception returns in Super Bowl history.

New Orleans Saints
Before the 2005 season he signed with the New Orleans Saints and played for them for a season. He was released in July 2006, after failed attempts to trade him.

Minnesota Vikings
Smith signed a three-year deal with the Vikings in July 2006. On February 20, 2008, the Vikings released him.

Detroit Lions
On February 27, 2008, he signed with the Detroit Lions. He received $5 million over 2 years. The deal reunited Smith with Lions' head coach Rod Marinelli and defensive coordinator Joe Barry, both of whom were assistants on the Tampa Bay staff when the veteran safety spent the first four seasons of his NFL career as a standout Bucs' defender.

Smith was released by the Lions on February 9, 2009.

References

External links
 Detroit Lions bio

1978 births
Living people
Akron Zips football players
All-American college football players
American football safeties
Detroit Lions players
Minnesota Vikings players
New Orleans Saints players
Players of American football from Detroit
Tampa Bay Buccaneers players